The FIFA World Cup is an international association football competition contested by the men's national teams of the members of the Fédération Internationale de Football Association (FIFA), the sport's global governing body. It has been contested every four years since the first tournament in 1930, except in 1942 and 1946, due to World War II.

The tournament consists of two parts, the qualification phase and the final phase (officially called the World Cup Finals). The qualification phase, which currently takes place over the three years preceding the finals, is used to determine which teams qualify for the finals. The current format of the finals involves 32 teams competing for the title, at venues within the host nation (or nations) over a period of about a month. The World Cup finals is the most widely viewed sporting event in the world, with an estimated 715.1 million people watching the final of the 2006 tournament.

The Indonesia national football team has only reached the FIFA World Cup finals once: the 1938 World Cup in France, where they competed under the name Dutch East Indies. The Dutch East Indies gained independence from the Netherlands and became known as Indonesia in 1949, and FIFA considers them to have inherited the record of the Dutch East Indies. The Dutch East Indies played their first World Cup finals match against Hungary in the round of 16 of the 1938 tournament, losing 6–0. The straight knockout format used at the time made it the only game the team played at the tournament. Thus, Indonesia is the sole record holder for the fewest matches played (1) at a World Cup, and one of several to have scored no goals.

The team tasted their first World Cup action as Indonesia in qualifying for the 1958 tournament. They got past China in the first round, but refused to play their next opponents Israel. The team did not take part in qualifying for the next three World Cups due to an unfavourable political situation – both internally and externally – before re-entering in 1974.

Overall record

By match

Record by opponent

Dutch East Indies at the 1938 FIFA World Cup

Bulgaria v Dutch East Indies

References

Indonesia at the FIFA World Cup
Indonesia
Indonesia national football team